Panagarh is a small town in the Durgapur subdivision of the Paschim Bardhaman district in the Indian state of West Bengal.

Geography

Location

Urbanisation
According to the 2011 census, 79.22% of the population of the Durgapur subdivision was urban and 20.78% was rural. The sole municipal corporation in the Durgapur subdivision is located at Durgapur and the subdivision has 38 (+1 partly) census towns (partly presented in the map alongside; all places marked on the map are linked in the full-screen map).

Indian Air Force base
Panagarh Airport was constructed in 1944, during the Second World War. It serves as a base for the Indian Air Force. In 2016, it was renamed as Air Force Station Arjan Singh.

Cantonment
One of the 62 cantonments in the country is located at Panagarh.

Demographics
According to the 2011 Census of India, Panagar had a total population of 5,510, of which 2,796 (51%) were males and 2,714 (49%) were females. Population in the age range 0–6 years was 650. The total number of literates in Panagar was 3,836 (78.93% of the population over 6 years).

Transport
Panagarh is a station on the Bardhaman–Asansol section, which is a part of Howrah–Gaya–Delhi line, Howrah–Allahabad–Mumbai line and Howrah–Delhi main line.

Earlier, National Highway 19 passed through Panagarh Bazar. A bypass was constructed in 2016, avoiding the crowded bazar area. The old Grand Trunk Road continues to pass through the town.

State Highway 14 passes through Panagarh. The Dubrajpur–Panagarh sector of SH 14 is part of Panagarh–Morgram Highway.

Education
Panagarh has five primary schools, Rama Krishna Ashrama Vidyapitha, the Kendriya Vidyalaya, Secondary School (Panagarh Railway Colony School) and three higher secondary schools (Panagarh Bazar Hindi High School, Kanksa High School and Kanksa Girls' High School).

Professional education
Panagarh has two engineering colleges viz. Aryabhatta Institute of Engineering & Management Durgapur and Techno India, Durgapur.

Healthcare
Panagarh Rural Hospital, with 30 beds, is the major government medical facility in the Kanksa CD block. There are 4 nonbedded primary health centres at Malandighi, Shibpur, Shyambazar and Shilampur and 26 health wellness centres.

References

Cities and towns in Paschim Bardhaman district
Durgapur, West Bengal